Lophoschema guayapa is a species of beetle in the family Cerambycidae, the only species in the genus Lophoschema.

References

Torneutini